Masters W65 marathon world record progression is the progression of world record improvements of the marathon W65 division of Masters athletics.  Records must be set in properly conducted, official competitions under the standing IAAF rules unless modified by World Masters Athletics.  

The W65 division consists of female athletes who have reached the age of 65 but have not yet reached the age of 70, so exactly from their 65th birthday to the day before their 70th birthday.  Marathon running is not normally seeded into age divisions so all of these records were set in marathon race open to most other age groups.

Key

References

External links
Masters Athletics Marathon list

Masters athletics world record progressions
Marathon world records